Marlon Andres Vera Delgado  (born December 2, 1992) is an Ecuadorian professional mixed martial artist. He currently competes in the Bantamweight division in the Ultimate Fighting Championship (UFC). Vera first appeared on The Ultimate Fighter: Latin America. As of March 13, 2023, he is #3 in the UFC bantamweight rankings.

Background
Vera was born into a middle-class family in Chone, Ecuador. He has an older sister and brother. Causing ruckus and getting into street fights throughout his youth, Vera started training in Brazilian jiu-jitsu in his newly-adopted hometown of Guayaquil at the age of 16.

Mixed martial arts career

Early career 
Vera began training as an amateur in 2011 and made his professional debut in February 2012. He compiled a record of 6–1–1, competing for regional promotions in Latin America before trying out for The Ultimate Fighter in 2014.

The Ultimate Fighter: Latin America 
In May 2014, it was revealed that Vera was a cast member of The Ultimate Fighter: Latin America, competing for Team Werdum.

Over the course of the show, Vera first defeated Henry Briones in the quarterfinals via knockout.  Subsequently, Vera was forced out of his semi-final bout with a skin infection and was replaced by Guido Cannetti.

Ultimate Fighting Championship 
Vera made his official debut against fellow castmate Marco Beltrán on November 15, 2014 at UFC 180. He lost the fight via unanimous decision.

For his next bout, Vera faced Roman Salazar on August 8, 2015 at UFC Fight Night 73. He won the fight via submission in the second round. He also earned a Performance of the Night bonus.

Vera faced Davey Grant on February 27, 2016 at UFC Fight Night 84.  Vera lost the fight via unanimous decision.

Vera was expected to face Ning Guangyou on August 20, 2016 at UFC 202. Subsequently, on August 9, 2016 it was revealed that Guangyou had tested positive for trace amounts of clenbuterol in relation to an out-of-competition drug test taken on May 19. Guangyou was cleared of wrongdoing after it was determined by USADA that he had possibly ingested tainted meat from China. As a result, he was not punished. The bout was rescheduled and expected to take place the following week at UFC on Fox 21. In turn, the bout was postponed again due to alleged visa issues for Guangyou, which restricted the timing of his travel. The pairing eventually took place at featherweight on November 27, 2016 at UFC Fight Night 101. He won the fight via unanimous decision.

Vera was briefly tabbed as a short notice replacement to face Jimmie Rivera on January 15, 2017. However, Rivera declined the fight and the pairing was scrapped.

Vera was an injury replacement for Henry Briones to face Brad Pickett on March 18, 2017 at UFC Fight Night 107. Due to the short notice and preparation for Vera, the bout was contested at a catchweight of 140 lbs. He won the fight via TKO in the third round for which he was awarded a Performance of the Night bonus.

Vera faced Brian Kelleher on July 22, 2017 at UFC on Fox 25. He won the fight via submission in the first round.

Vera faced John Lineker on October 28, 2017 at UFC Fight Night 119. He lost the fight via unanimous decision.

Vera faced Douglas Silva de Andrade on February 3, 2018 at UFC Fight Night 125. He lost the fight via unanimous decision.

Vera faced Wuliji Buren on August 8, 2018 at UFC 227. He won the fight via TKO in the second round.

Vera faced Guido Cannetti on November 17, 2018 at UFC Fight Night 140. He won the fight via a rear-naked choke in round two.

Vera was expected to face Thomas Almeida on March 2, 2019 at UFC 235. However Almeida pulled out of the fight on January 31, citing an injury, and was replaced by Frankie Saenz. In turn, Vera pulled out of the fight on February 27 due to illness and the bout was scrapped from the event. The bout was rescheduled to UFC Fight Night 148. Vera won the fight via technical knockout in round one.

Vera was scheduled to face Sean O'Malley on July 6, 2019 at UFC 239. However, O'Malley announced his withdraw from the bout on June 21, 2019 due a failed test for ostarine. O'Malley was replaced by newcomer Nohelin Hernandez. He won the fight via a rear-naked choke in round two.

Vera faced Andre Ewell on October 12, 2019 at UFC Fight Night 161. He won the fight via technical knockout. This win earned him the Performance of the Night bonus award.

Vera was scheduled to face Jimmie Rivera on February 8, 2020 at UFC 247. However, Rivera pulled out of the fight on January 23 citing an injury. In turn, promotion officials elected to remove Vera from the card.

Vera was expected to face Eddie Wineland on March 28, 2020 at UFC on ESPN: Ngannou vs. Rozenstruik. However, the event was cancelled due to the COVID-19 pandemic. Instead, Vera faced Song Yadong in a featherweight bout on May 16, 2020 at UFC on ESPN: Overeem vs. Harris. He lost the fight via unanimous decision. Both participants earned the Fight of the Night award.

Vera faced Sean O'Malley on August 15, 2020 at UFC 252.  Vera defeated O'Malley via first round TKO. Vera finished O'Malley with a flurry of strikes after dropping him with a calf kick.

Vera faced José Aldo on December 19, 2020 at UFC Fight Night: Thompson vs Neal. He lost the fight via unanimous decision.

A rematch of Vera's 2016 bout with Davey Grant took place on June 19, 2021 at UFC on ESPN 25. Vera won the bout this time via unanimous decision. The bout earned both fighters the Fight of the Night award.

Vera faced Frankie Edgar on November 6, 2021 at UFC 268. Vera won the fight via front kick knockout in round three. This win earned him the Performance of the Night award.

Vera faced Rob Font on April 30, 2022 at UFC on ESPN 35. At the weigh-ins, Font weighed in at 138.5 pounds, two and half pounds over the bantamweight non-title fight limit. The bout proceeded at a catchweight with Font forfeiting 20% of his purse to Vera. Vera won the bout via unanimous decision. This fight earned him the Fight of the Night award and also Font's bonus due to his weight miss.

Vera faced Dominick Cruz on August 13, 2022 at UFC on ESPN 41. Vera won the fight via knockout in the fourth round. This win earned him the Performance of the Night award.

Vera was scheduled to face Cory Sandhagen on February 18, 2023 at UFC Fight Night 219. However, the bout was moved to UFC on ESPN 43 on March 25 for unknown reasons.

Personal life 
Vera is married to María Paulina Escobar. They have two daughters, born in 2011 and 2018, and a son, born in 2015. His eldest daughter has a rare neurological condition Möbius syndrome, for which Vera created a GoFundMe account. In June 2018, Vera announced that they had raised sufficient donations for a surgery, which was planned to take place in California during the summer of 2018.

In 2017 Vera signed an advertisement deal with Pepsi through which his fans will see him on billboards all across his home country.

Championships & accomplishments

Mixed martial arts
 Ultimate Fighting Championship
 Performance of the Night (Five times) 
 Fight of the Night (Three times) 
Most finishes in UFC Bantamweight division history (10)
Tied (Petr Yan) for most knockdowns in UFC Bantamweight division history (10)
Tied (Urijah Faber and T.J. Dillashaw) for third most bouts in UFC Bantamweight division history (17)
Tied (Raphael Assuncao) for third most wins in UFC Bantamweight division history (12)
Second most knockouts in UFC Bantamweight division history (6)
ESPN
2022 Most Improved Fighter of the Year

Mixed martial arts record 

|-
|Win
|align=center|20–7–1
|Dominick Cruz
|KO (head kick)
|UFC on ESPN: Vera vs. Cruz
|
|align=center|4
|align=center|2:17
|San Diego, California, United States
|
|-
|Win
|align=center|19–7–1
|Rob Font
|Decision (unanimous)
|UFC on ESPN: Font vs. Vera
|
|align=center|5
|align=center|5:00
|Las Vegas, Nevada, United States
|
|-
|Win
|align=center|18–7–1
|Frankie Edgar
|KO (front kick)
|UFC 268
|
|align=center|3
|align=center|3:50
|New York City, New York, United States
|
|-
|Win
|align=center|17–7–1
|Davey Grant
|Decision (unanimous)
|UFC on ESPN: The Korean Zombie vs. Ige
|
|align=center|3
|align=center|5:00
|Las Vegas, Nevada, United States
|
|-
|Loss
|align=center|
|José Aldo
|Decision (unanimous)
|UFC Fight Night: Thompson vs. Neal
|
|align=center|3
|align=center|5:00
|Las Vegas, Nevada, United States
|
|-
|Win
|align=center|16–6–1
|Sean O'Malley
|TKO (elbows and punches)
|UFC 252
|
|align=center|1
|align=center|4:40
|Las Vegas, Nevada, United States
|
|-
|Loss
|align=center|15–6–1
|Song Yadong
|Decision (unanimous)
|UFC on ESPN: Overeem vs. Harris
|
|align=center|3
|align=center|5:00
|Jacksonville, Florida, United States
|
|-
|Win
|align=center|15–5–1
|Andre Ewell
|TKO (elbows and punches)
|UFC Fight Night: Joanna vs. Waterson 
|
|align=center|3
|align=center|3:17
|Tampa, Florida, United States
|
|-
|Win
|align=center|14–5–1
|Nohelin Hernandez
|Submission (rear-naked choke) 
|UFC 239 
|
|align=center|2
|align=center|3:25
|Las Vegas, Nevada, United States
|
|-
|Win
|align=center|13–5–1
|Frankie Saenz
|TKO (punches) 
|UFC Fight Night: Thompson vs. Pettis 
|
|align=center|1
|align=center|1:25 
|Nashville, Tennessee, United States
|
|-
|Win
|align=center|12–5–1
|Guido Cannetti
|Submission (rear-naked choke)
|UFC Fight Night: Magny vs. Ponzinibbio 
|
|align=center|2
|align=center|1:31
|Buenos Aires, Argentina
|  
|-
|Win
|align=center|11–5–1
|Wuliji Buren
|TKO (body punch)
|UFC 227 
|
|align=center|2
|align=center|4:53
|Los Angeles, California, United States
|
|-
|Loss
|align=center|10–5–1
|Douglas Silva de Andrade
|Decision (unanimous)
|UFC Fight Night: Machida vs. Anders
|
|align=center|3
|align=center|5:00
|Belém, Brazil
|
|-
|Loss
|align=center|10–4–1
|John Lineker
|Decision (unanimous)
|UFC Fight Night: Brunson vs. Machida
|
|align=center|3
|align=center|5:00
|São Paulo, Brazil
|
|-
|Win
|align=center|10–3–1
|Brian Kelleher
|Submission (armbar)
|UFC on Fox: Weidman vs. Gastelum
|
|align=center|1
|align=center|2:18
|Uniondale, New York, United States
|
|-
|Win
|align=center|9–3–1
|Brad Pickett
|TKO (head kick and punches)
|UFC Fight Night: Manuwa vs. Anderson
|
|align=center|3
|align=center|3:50
|London, England
|
|-
|Win
|align=center|8–3–1
|Ning Guangyou
|Decision (unanimous)
|UFC Fight Night: Whittaker vs. Brunson
|
|align=center|3
|align=center|5:00
|Melbourne, Australia
|
|-
| Loss
| align=center| 7–3–1
| Davey Grant
| Decision (unanimous)
| UFC Fight Night: Silva vs. Bisping
| 
| align=center| 3
| align=center| 5:00
| London, England
|
|-
| Win
| align=center| 7–2–1
| Roman Salazar
| Submission (triangle armbar)
| UFC Fight Night: Teixeira vs. Saint Preux
| 
| align=center| 2
| align=center| 2:15
| Nashville, Tennessee, United States
| 
|-
| Loss
| align=center| 6–2–1
| Marco Beltrán
| Decision (unanimous)
| UFC 180
| 
| align=center| 3
| align=center| 5:00
| Mexico City, Mexico
|
|-
| Win
| align=center| 6–1–1
| D'Juan Owens
| Submission (heel hook)
| Inka FC 24
| 
| align=center| 1
| align=center| 1:54
| Lima, Peru
|
|-
| Loss
| align=center| 5–1–1
| Bruno Leandro Lobato
| Decision (unanimous)
| Inka FC 23
| 
| align=center| 3
| align=center| 5:00
| Lima, Peru
|
|-
| Draw
| align=center| 5–0–1
| Fábio Bispo
| Draw (unanimous)
| Inka FC 22
| 
| align=center| 3
| align=center| 5:00
| Lima, Peru
|
|-
| Win
| align=center| 5–0
| Luis Roberto Herrera
| Submission (rear-naked choke)
| FMP 16: Mexican Fighters Promotions 16
| 
| align=center| 1
| align=center| 1:50
| Chihuahua City, Mexico
|
|-
| Win
| align=center| 4–0
| Joel Iglesias
| KO (elbows)
| 300 Sparta
| 
| align=center| 1
| align=center| 4:04
| Lima, Peru
|
|-
| Win
| align=center| 3–0
| Javier Umana Munoz
| Submission (triangle choke)
| Panama Fight League: Ultimate Combat Challenge 13
| 
| align=center| 2
| align=center| 4:44
| Panama City, Panama
|
|-
| Win
| align=center| 2–0
| Jack Guzman
| Submission (triangle choke)
| Samurai FC 7: Peace and War
| 
| align=center| 1
| align=center| N/A
| Quito, Ecuador
|
|-
| Win
| align=center| 1–0
| Cesar Moreno
| Decision (unanimous)
| EMMA 2: Conflicto
| 
| align=center| 3
| align=center| 5:00
| Santa Elena, Ecuador
|
|-

See also 
 List of current UFC fighters
 List of male mixed martial artists

References

External links
 
 

1992 births
Living people
People from Chone, Ecuador
Ecuadorian male mixed martial artists
Ecuadorian practitioners of Brazilian jiu-jitsu
People awarded a black belt in Brazilian jiu-jitsu
Bantamweight mixed martial artists
Featherweight mixed martial artists
Mixed martial artists utilizing Brazilian jiu-jitsu
Ultimate Fighting Championship male fighters